Toback is a surname. Notable people with the surname include:

James Toback (born 1944), American screenwriter and film director
Paul Toback, American lawyer